William Torelle Joppy (born September 11, 1970) is an American former professional boxer who competed from 1993 to 2011, and held the WBA middleweight title three times between 1996 and 2003.

Professional career
Joppy won his first of three WBA middleweight titles in June 1996 by stopping defender Shinji Takehara in Japan with a flurry of punches in the ninth round.  He then would make a couple defenses of his crown.  However, on August 23, 1997, Joppy lost a decision to Julio César Green.  Joppy's very next fight, on January 31 of the next year, saw him avenge that loss with a decision win by a wide margin. This fight won Joppy the WBA title for the second time. After recovering from a neck injury, Joppy stopped Green on cuts in the seventh round in a rubber match (Green had been the interim champion while Joppy recovered), and made a few more defenses, including a 3rd-round TKO of a 47-year-old Roberto Durán.

Unsuccessful unification against Trinidad
Joppy lost the title a second time, however, on May 12, 2001, to Félix Trinidad in the middleweight unification tournament. Joppy was knocked down in rounds one and four before finally being stopped in the fifth. After the WBA title was vacated due to Bernard Hopkins beating Trinidad, Joppy had the chance to fight for it again. He claimed the title from British contender Howard Eastman in a close majority decision where he was knocked down by Eastman in the final few seconds.

On December 14, 2003, Joppy lost his title to Bernard Hopkins, losing by a wide points margin on all three judges' cards. A year later, Joppy lost another lopsided unanimous decision against Jermain Taylor.

Joppy returned as a Super Middleweight on July 29, 2005 knocking out journeyman Rashaan Blackburn in the third round. Joppy said then that he hoped to have one final title run as a Super Middleweight before retirement. After a string of five victories against lesser opponents, Joppy obtained a title fight against the new IBF champion Lucian Bute on February 29, 2008. Bute won by way of technical knockout in round 10 and Joppy retired after the bout, only to come back two years later.

Retirement
Following a close decision loss to Sebastien Demers in March 2010 Joppy announced his retirement from boxing, although it was not the first time that Joppy has announced that he is leaving the sport. He returned to the ring later that year, fighting Baltimore native Cory Cummings to a draw, and subsequently defeated Cummings by unanimous decision in a 2011 rematch.

Professional boxing record

References

External links

1970 births
Living people
Middleweight boxers
Boxers from Maryland
American male boxers
Light-heavyweight boxers
World Boxing Association champions
World middleweight boxing champions